Elin Ruth, (born November 23, 1981, in Mönsterås, Småland) is a Swedish singer-songwriter. Her music has been published variously under the names Elin Ruth, Elin Ruth Sigvardsson,
 and Elin Sigvardsson.

Elin Ruth debuted in 2003 with the album Saturday Light Naive which was produced by Lars Winnerbäck. The album was hailed by critics and led to a Swedish Grammy nomination for best new artist. In early 2005 she released her second album Smithereens, which she produced herself. In December 2007 she released her third album, A Fiction.

In 2009 Elin Ruth started her own record company, Divers Avenue Music, and on October 7 released her self-produced, fourth album Cookatoo Friends.

She moved to Stockholm at the age of 19, and moved to New York in 2011.

She wrote and performed the opening theme to the Swedish crime drama series Irene Huss, "Free to Fall (Apart)".

Elin Ruth discography

Albums 
Saturday Light Naive (2003)
Smithereens (2005)
A Fiction (2007)
Cookatoo Friends (2009)
Queen Of Queens & The Last Man Standing LP (2012)
Bang EP (2012)
Here Comes the Storm (2014)
Debris (2015)
Christmas Is a Drag (2015)

1981 births
Living people
People from Mönsterås Municipality
21st-century Swedish singers
21st-century Swedish women singers